Law and Social Inquiry is a quarterly peer-reviewed academic journal published by Wiley-Blackwell on behalf of the American Bar Foundation. It was established in 1976. The current editor-in-chief is Christopher W. Schmidt (Chicago-Kent College of Law). According to the Journal Citation Reports, the journal has a 2015 impact factor of 0.861.

References

External links

Wiley-Blackwell academic journals
English-language journals
Publications established in 1976
Quarterly journals
Law journals
Cambridge University Press academic journals